Clive was a parliamentary electorate in the Hawke's Bay Region of New Zealand from 1861 to 1881.

Population centres

The electorate was centred on the town of Clive.

History

Clive was formed for the 3rd New Zealand Parliament, i.e. in 1861. It existed until 1881. During this period, Clive was represented by one Member of Parliament, John Davies Ormond.

Members
Key

References

Historical electorates of New Zealand
Politics of the Hawke's Bay Region
1860 establishments in New Zealand
1881 disestablishments in New Zealand